George Clarke (7 May 1661 – 22 October 1736), of All Souls, Oxford, was an English architect, print collector and  Tory politician who sat in the English and British House of Commons between 1702 and 1736.

Life
The son of Sir William Clarke, he enrolled at Brasenose College, Oxford in 1676.  He was elected a Fellow of All Souls College, Oxford in 1680. He was returned in a contested by-election on 23 November 1685 as Member of Parliament for Oxford University, but never took his seat as Parliament had been prorogued. He became Judge Advocate to the Army and was Secretary at War in Ireland from 1690 to 1692 and in England from 1693 to 1704 under William III of England and Queen Anne. He served as secretary to Prince George of Denmark, Queen Anne's consort and the Lord High Admiral and Generalissimo of England.

Clarke was returned as Member of Parliament for Winchelsea at the 1702 English general election, coinciding with his office as Joint Secretary of the Admiralty. At the 1705 English general election he was returned as MP for  East Looe. He was not nominated for a seat at the 1708 British general election. He was returned in a by-election on 29 May 1711 as MP for  Launceston from 1711. He did not stand at the 1713 British general election.  Over the latter period he was Lord Commissioner of the Admiralty from 20 December 1710 until 14 October 1714, when he was dismissed following the accession of George I.

Clarke returned to the House of Commons as MP for Oxford University at a by-election on 4 December 1717 following the death of William Whitelock. He was reelected in 1722, 1727, and 1734, by which point he had lost his left eye and was losing sight in the other.

He was also an amateur architect. His known work is largely confined to Oxford, (Clayton's DNB entry for Clarke offers more detail of his architectural endeavours) and he is known to have designed buildings and also to have collaborated with Nicholas Hawksmoor, amongst others.

Timothy Clayton discusses Clarke's print collection, noting “John Vanburgh, Alexander Pope and George Vertue travelled to Oxford to use his library with its unique collection of notes and drawings by [Inigo] Jones” (Clayton 1992, p. 124).

The library of Worcester College, Oxford houses Clarke's collection of books, MSS, prints and drawings. Building work on the library, which was started within a few years of the college's founding in 1714, was completed in 1736. A spat between Clarke and All Souls resulted in the bequest to Worcester.

List of architectural works

The library in the Peckwater Quad, Christ Church, Oxford (1717–38)

Rebuilt The Queen's College, Oxford, with Hawksmoor (1710–21)

The New Buildings, Magdalen College, Oxford (1733)

The Hall, Chapel and Library, Worcester College, Oxford (1733–1753)

The Rectory, Kingston Bagpuize (c.1723)

Cokethorpe House, alterations (c.1710)

Gallery of architectural work

References

Clayton, T. (1992) “The Print Collection of George Clarke at Worcester College, Oxford”. Print Quarterly 9(2) 123–141.

George Clarke Print Collection

http://www.historyofparliamentonline.org/volume/1715-1754/member/clarke-george-1661-1736

Further reading

Clayton, T. (1997) The English Print 1688–1802. Yale University Press. London.

Clayton, T. (2004) "Clarke, George (1661–1736)". Oxford Dictionary of National Biography. Oxford University Press, 2004. Online edition. DOI: http://www.oxforddnb.com/view/article/5496

1661 births
1736 deaths
British MPs 1715–1722
British MPs 1722–1727
British MPs 1727–1734
British MPs 1734–1741
British MPs 1710–1713
British MPs 1707–1708
Members of the Parliament of Great Britain for English constituencies
Lords of the Admiralty
Alumni of Brasenose College, Oxford
Fellows of All Souls College, Oxford
Members of the Parliament of Great Britain for Oxford University
Members of the pre-1707 English Parliament for constituencies in Cornwall
Members of the Parliament of Great Britain for constituencies in Cornwall
English MPs 1702–1705
English MPs 1705–1707
English blind people
18th-century Royal Navy personnel